Nesjøen (sometimes just Nesjø) is an artificial lake (reservoir) in the municipality of Tydal in Trøndelag county, Norway. The lake is part of the Nea-Nidelv watershed which lies on the western part of the Sylan mountain range. The lake is good for trout fishing.

History
Trondheim Energiverk was given the contract for hydroelectric power generation in 1968 and they built and completed a dam in 1971. The dam was built on the Nea River and would flood the bogs to the east and north and would create a lake that would eventually merge with the nearby lake Esandsjøen.

Esandsjøen
Esandsjøen (or Essansjøen) is a former lake in the municipality of Tydal that is now part of Nesjøen. Esandsjøen became regulated for hydroelectric power production by Trondheim Energiverk with the construction of a dam at Esna that was built from 1941 until 1947. In 1971, another nearby dam was built and that lake gradually enlarged until it essentially merged with the Esandsjøen. Today the name Essandsjøen is used to refer to the northern part of the lake Nesjøen.

See also
List of lakes in Norway

References

Tydal
Lakes of Trøndelag
Reservoirs in Norway